Novoyeldyakovo (Yañı Yäldäk) is a rural locality (a selo) in Vostretsovsky Selsoviet, Burayevsky District, Bashkortostan, Russia. The population was 308 in 2010. There are four streets.

Geography 
Novoyeldyakovo is located 44 km southwest of Burayevo (the district's administrative centre) by road. Kamelevo is the nearest rural locality.

References 

Rural localities in Burayevsky District